Skeletocutis carneogrisea is a species of poroid crust fungus in the family Polyporaceae. It was described as new to science by Alix David in 1982. It is found in Europe, South America, and China.

References

Fungi described in 1982
Fungi of China
Fungi of Europe
Fungi of South America
carneogrisea